The 1988 United States Senate election in Missouri was held on November 8, 1988 to select the U.S. Senator from the state of Missouri.  Incumbent Republican U.S. Senator John Danforth won re-election.

Candidates

Democratic
Jay Nixon, State Senator

Republican
John Danforth, incumbent U.S. Senator

Results

See also 
 1988 United States Senate elections

References

1988 Missouri elections
Missouri
1988